Shepherdson is a surname. Notable people with the surname include:

Arunah Shepherdson Abell (1806–1888), American publisher
 Ella Shepherdson, missionary in Australia whose name was given to Shepherdson College on Elcho Island, Northern Territory
Guy Shepherdson (born 1982), Australian rugby player
Harold Shepherdson (1918–1995), English football player and coach
Jane Shepherdson (born 1961), British businesswoman